Nanzhou is a town of Zhuzhou County, Hunan, China. Amalgamating the former Nanyangqiao and Zhouping two townships, the town was established on November 26, 2015. The town is divided into 19 villages and a community, its administrative centre is Nanzhou Village (南洲村).

Subdivisions

References

External links
 Official site

Divisions of Zhuzhou County